Tyler Gavin Junior Smith (born 4 December 1998) is an English professional footballer who plays as a striker for Oxford United, on loan from Hull City.

Career
Born in Sheffield, Smith began his career with Sheffield United. He spent the first half of the 2018–19 season on loan at Barrow, before moving on loan to Doncaster Rovers in January 2019. He scored two goals on his debut on 19 January 2019, and was praised by manager Grant McCann as being "a star in the making". In July 2019 he moved on loan to Bristol Rovers for the 2019–20 season. In January 2020 he moved on loan to Rochdale.

On 6 August 2020 he moved on loan to Swindon Town for the 2020–21 season. On 8 September 2020 he scored his first goal for Swindon in an EFL Trophy tie against West Bromwich Albion U21s.

He moved to Hull City in August 2021. He made his debut for the club on 28 August 2021 in a 0–0 home draw against AFC Bournemouth. He scored his first goal for the club within the 1st-minute of the FA Cup match against Everton on 8 January 2022.

On 31 January 2023, Smith joined Oxford United on loan until the end of the season.

Career statistics

References

1998 births
Living people
English footballers
Sheffield United F.C. players
Barrow A.F.C. players
Doncaster Rovers F.C. players
Bristol Rovers F.C. players
Rochdale A.F.C. players
Swindon Town F.C. players
Hull City A.F.C. players
Oxford United F.C. players
English Football League players
Association football forwards